Liverpool, New York & Philadelphia S. S. Co. v. Commissioners of Emigration, 113 U.S. 33 (1885), was a case decided by the United States Supreme Court, in which the court held that the plaintiff was in error, being a corporation under the laws of Great Britain, and an alien, had brought this action in the circuit court of the United States for the Southern district of New York, the defendant being a corporation of that state.

Background

Treating it as a complaint according to the procedure under the New York Code, the defendant filed an answer setting up several different defenses, which included the following: "That by an act of congress, entitled 'A bill to legalize the collection of head- moneys already paid,' approved June 19, 1878, the acts of every state and municipal officer or corporation in the several states of the United States in collection of head-moneys for every passenger brought to the United States prior to the first day of January 1877, under then existing laws of the several states, were declared valid, and the [113 U.S. 33, 35]." 

The case was cited in the per curiam decision Petite vs. United States.

See also
List of United States Supreme Court cases, volume 113

References

External links
113 33 Justia.com (full case)

United States Supreme Court cases
1885 in United States case law
United States admiralty case law
United States Supreme Court cases of the Waite Court